Jumpol Adulkittiporn (born 20 January 1991), also known as Off, is a Thai actor, model and host.

He is known for his main role as Khai in Theory of Love, Sean in Not Me and Tankhun in Astrophile, for which he has received  'Asian Academy Creative: National Winner 2022 Award' in Best Supporting Actor category.

Early life and education 
Jumpol was born in Bangkok, Thailand. He completed his secondary education in Wat Rajabopit School. He graduated with a bachelor's degree from the Faculty of Information and Communication Technology in Silpakorn University.

Career 
Jumpol began working in the entertainment industry as host of the 2013 TV program Five Live Fresh. After the show, he debuted as an actor with a guest role in the 2013 Thai drama series Hormones, and got his first main role in the 2014 series Room Alone.

Jumpol continued working with GMMTV. He gained prominence for playing Pick in 'Senior Secret Love: Puppy Honey' (2016) and its respective sequel alongside Atthaphan Phunsawat. He later went on to star in the 2019 romantic drama Theory of Love and 2021 action drama Not Me.

In 2022, under GMMTV, Jumpol starred in the series Astrophile for which he received 'Best Supporting Actor Award'.

Filmography

Drama

Special

Music video appearances

Television

Discography

Singles

Awards and nominations

References

External links 
 

1991 births
Living people
Jumpol Adulkittiporn
Jumpol Adulkittiporn
Jumpol Adulkittiporn
Jumpol Adulkittiporn
Jumpol Adulkittiporn